Mongolia joined the Ramsar Convention  on Wetlands of International Importance Especially as Waterfowl Habitat on April 8, 1998. There are currently 11 wetlands designated as Ramsar sites in Mongolia.

List

Map

See also
 Ramsar Convention
 List of Ramsar sites worldwide

References

External links
The Annotated Ramsar List: Mongolia



 
Geography of Mongolia
Mongolia